Arthur Margelidon (born October 12, 1993, in Paris, France) is a Canadian judoka who competes in the men's 73 kg category.

Career
Margelidon won the bronze medal the 2015 Pan American Games in Toronto, and the gold medal at the 2016 Pan American Judo Championships in Havana.

In June 2016, he was selected for Canada's Olympic team, but he had to withdraw after he injured his arm. In June 2021, Margelidon was named to Canada's 2020 Olympic team. Margelidon would go onto finish in fifth place, one victory away from a bronze medal.

See also
 Judo in Quebec
 Judo in Canada
 List of Canadian judoka

References

External links
 
 Profile at Judo Canada

Canadian male judoka
1993 births
Living people
Judoka at the 2015 Pan American Games
Pan American Games bronze medalists for Canada
Judoka at the 2016 Summer Olympics
Pan American Games medalists in judo
Olympic judoka of Canada
Medalists at the 2015 Pan American Games
Judoka at the 2020 Summer Olympics
21st-century Canadian people